Pomaderris brunnea, commonly known as rufous pomaderris, is a species of flowering plant in the family Rhamnaceae and is endemic to south-eastern Australia. It is a shrub with hairy stems, elliptic to lance-shaped leaves with the narrower end towards the base, and dense panicles of yellowish flowers.

Description
The edges of  the leaves are more or less toothed, the upper surface dark green with valleys above the veins, the lower surface densely covered with brownish and woolly white hairs. Flowering occurs in October and the fruit is a capsule covered with long rusty hairs.

Taxonomy
Pomaderris brunnea was first formally described in 1951 by Norman Arthur Wakefield in The Victorian Naturalist from specimens collected by William Blakely, near the Hawkesbury River, on the edge of the salt water, in 1918. The specific epithet (brunnea) means "brown".

Distribution and habitat
Rufous pomaderris grows in moist woodland or forest and in sheltered river and creek banks. It is known from sixteen populations in the Sydney area, the North Coast and the New England Tableland, and from two populations near the junction of the Rodger and Snowy Rivers in eastern Victoria.

Conservation status
Pomaderris brunnea is listed as "vulnerable" under the Australian Government Environment Protection and Biodiversity Conservation Act 1999, and as "endangered" under the New South Wales Government Biodiversity Conservation Act 2016.

References

brunnea
Flora of New South Wales
Flora of Victoria (Australia)
Taxa named by Norman Arthur Wakefield
Plants described in 1951